Hugh Bell (1780 – 16 May 1860) was a member of the Nova Scotia House of Assembly. He had portraits painted of himself and his wife by Halifax-based artist William Valentine.  Bell founded the Nova Scotia Hospital, and was also vice-president of the Royal Acadian School.

References 
 Biography at the Dictionary of Canadian Biography Online

1780 births
1860 deaths
Nova Scotia pre-Confederation MLAs